Brisbane Adventist College is an independent Seventh-day Adventist co-educational early learning, primary and secondary day school located in the Brisbane suburbs of Mansfield (primary school) and Wishart (secondary school). Part of the Seventh-day Adventist education system, the world's second largest Christian school system. Enrolment is open to families of all faiths.

Brisbane Adventist College started as a primary school in 1966. The primary school was one of the first established in the  area. A secondary school was established in 1972 along Wishart Road. Both campuses grew steadily over the years. Then in 1999 they were amalgamated, along with the Early Learning Centre, into one college. Affectionately known as BAC, the school continues to provide Christian education for students from our wider community. The current student catchment is wide-ranging and extends from Ormeau and Ipswich to the Bay area.

Spiritual aspects

All enrolled students take religion classes. These classes cover such topics as biblical history, and Christian and denominational doctrines. Teachers in other subject areas may also begin each class period with prayer or spiritual thought, and encourage student input. Weekly, the student body gathers for an hour-long chapel service.

Sports

The College offers students access to touch football, basketball, rugby (league and/or union), netball, Futsal (soccer) and volleyball.

Notable alumni

 Kylie Gould (class of 1999) - TV personality
 Demi Harman - actress, Home and Away

See also

 List of Seventh-day Adventist secondary and elementary schools
 Seventh-day Adventist education
 List of schools in Queensland
 List of Seventh-day Adventist secondary schools

References

External links
 Brisbane Adventist College website
 BACLife
 Bec Reid provides pictures and stories of her aboringal husband's days at Brisbane Adventist College. Event: Brisbane's 45th Reunion.

Private primary schools in Brisbane
Private secondary schools in Brisbane
Educational institutions established in 1966
Adventist secondary schools in Australia
1966 establishments in Australia